Bryant Public Schools (or Bryant Public School District) is a public school district based in Bryant, Arkansas, United States. Since the 2010–11 school year, the school district provides early childhood, elementary and secondary education to more than 8,000 students in prekindergarten through grade 12 and employs more than 875 educators and staff at its schools and district offices. BPS encompasses  of land in Saline County.

It supports all portions of Bryant, Alexander, Avilla, Bauxite, Benton, Salem CDP, Shannon Hills, and Paron.

History
In the early 1970s, political aide Carol Rasco set up the public school system's psychological counseling services while she worked in the district.

On July 1, 2004 the Paron School District merged into the Bryant School District. Because the state government considered Paron an isolated rural area, it gave an additional $838,000 to the Bryant district. Due to low student populations and the resulting complications, the district closed Paron High School in 2006, and Paron Elementary School in 2015.

In 2011, Bryant School District and its high school were recognized in the AP District of the Year Awards program in the College Board's 2nd Annual Honor Roll that consisted of 367 U.S. public school districts (4 in Arkansas) that simultaneously achieved increases in access to AP® courses for a broader number of students and improved the rate at which their AP students earned scores of 3 or higher on an AP Exam.

Schools 
High schools:
Bryant High School, grades 10-12 located in Bryant
Bryant Jr. High , grade 9 &8

Middle schools:
Bryant Middle School, grades 6&7located in Bryant
Bethel Middle School, grades 6–8 located in Alexander (to be open only to 6-7 graders in 2019)

In 2017, Bryant Public Schools announced a junior high school, which will be open in the 2019-20 school year to 8th through 9th graders.

Elementary schools:
 Bryant Elementary, prekindergarten through grade 5 located in Bryant
 Collegeville Elementary, kindergarten through grade 5 located in Bryant
 Robert L. Davis Elementary, kindergarten through grade 5 located in Alexander
 Hurricane Creek Elementary, kindergarten through grade 5 located in Benton
 Salem Elementary, kindergarten through grade 5 located in Bryant
 Springhill Elementary, kindergarten through grade 5 located in Alexander
 Hillfarm Elementary, kindergarten through grade 5 located in Bryant
Parkway  Elementary, kindergarten through grade 5 located in Parkway

Former schools
 Paron High School in Paron (Unincorporated area) - Acquired in 2004, closed in 2006
 Paron Elementary School in Paron (Unincorporated area) - Acquired in 2004. In 2015, the Bryant district voted to close Paron Elementary School. At the time it had about 75 students. Paron students were reassigned to Salem Elementary School.

Notable alumni 
 Travis Wood - Current Professional baseball player for the Chicago Cubs
 Shane Broadway - Former Arkansas State Senator

Further reading
 Maps of the district and predecessors
 2004-2005 School District Map
 Map of Arkansas School Districts pre-July 1, 2004
  (Download) - Includes the boundary of the Bryant district in the 1950s

References

External links 

Bryant Public Schools website

Education in Saline County, Arkansas
School districts in Arkansas